Allan Cooper (18 March 1916 – 7 September 1970) was an Australian cricketer. He played seven first-class matches for New South Wales in 1935/36.

See also
 List of New South Wales representative cricketers

References

External links
 

1916 births
1970 deaths
Australian cricketers
New South Wales cricketers
Cricketers from Sydney